Fleur Olive Lourens de Villiers, CMG, (born December 1937) is chairman of the trustees of the International Institute for Strategic Studies. In 2011 she was invested as a Companion of the Order of St Michael and St George for services to democratic transition, reconciliation and governance in South Africa. She is a Global Ambassador for the School of Oriental and African Studies (SOAS), University of London.

References

Living people
Companions of the Order of St Michael and St George
South African journalists
1937 births